Richard David Lindsay II is a Democratic member of the West Virginia Senate, representing the 8th district since January 9, 2019.

Election results

References

Living people
Politicians from Charleston, West Virginia
West Virginia lawyers
Democratic Party West Virginia state senators
George Washington University alumni
Wingate University alumni
21st-century American politicians
Year of birth missing (living people)